María Alicia de la Rosa López (born 12 October 1963) is a Mexican politician affiliated with the Institutional Revolutionary Party. She served as Municipal President of Aguascalientes from 1991 to 1992 following the resignation of Armando Romero Rosales.

See also
 List of mayors of Aguascalientes

References

1963 births
Living people
People from Aguascalientes City
Institutional Revolutionary Party politicians
Municipal presidents in Aguascalientes
20th-century Mexican politicians
20th-century Mexican women politicians
Politicians from Aguascalientes
Autonomous University of Aguascalientes alumni